The 2010 Ironman 70.3 World Championship was a triathlon competition held in Clearwater, Florida on November 13, 2010. It was sponsored by Foster Grant and organized by the World Triathlon Corporation. The championship race was the culmination of the Ironman 70.3 series of events that occurred from October 2009 to September 2010. Athletes, both professional and amateur, earned a spot in the championship race by qualifying in races throughout the 70.3 series. The 2010 Championship was won by Michael Raelert of Germany and Jodie Swallow of Great Britain.

This year marked the end of the Championship race being in Clearwater, Florida; which the city has hosted for five years. The Championship race moves to Henderson, Nevada, a suburb of Las Vegas, Nevada in 2011.

Medallists

Men

Women

Qualification
The 2010 Ironman 70.3 Series featured 39 events that enabled qualification to the 2010 World Championship event. Some 70.3 events also served as qualifiers for the full Ironman World Championships in Hawaii. The 70.3 Series expanded the number of qualifying races from 34 in 2009 to 39 events in 2010. Those events added included races at Galveston Island (Texas), New Foundland Lake (Mooseman), Racine, Boulder, Japan, Branson, and Syracuse. The 5-year old Monaco Ironman 70.3 is no longer part of the series, which was re-labeled the TriStar111 Monaco. Early in 2010, the Ironman 70.3 Putrajaya race was tentatively scheduled for July 2010, but was removed from the series pending a reformat of the race.

Qualifying Ironman 70.3s

2010 Ironman 70.3 Series results

Men

Women

References

External links
Ironman 70.3 Series website

2010
2010 in triathlon
2010 Ironman 70.3
2010 in American sports
Sports competitions in Florida
2010 in sports in Florida
November 2010 sports events in the United States
Sports in Clearwater, Florida